Ruined Reeds (상한 갈대 Sanghan galdae) is a 1984 South Korean film by Yu Hyun-mok.

Plot
The film tells the story of the Korean wife of an American GI who struggles to save her mixed race son after he joins a biker gang.

Cast
Choi Chong-min
Park Il-jun
Mun Sun-seop
Lee Ja-young
Na So-un
Moon Mi-bong
Han Jae-su
Jang Gang-won

External links
 
 

1984 films
South Korean drama films
Films directed by Yu Hyun-mok
1984 drama films